Blum is a 1970 Argentine film directed by Julio Porter.

Cast

Darío Vittori as Blum
Nélida Lobato as Lucy
Enzo Viena as Pereyra
Maurice Jouvet as Aliso
Mabel Manzotti as Renata
Marta Ecco as Blum's Mistress
Leda Zanda as Blum's Sister

External links
 

1970 films
Argentine romantic comedy-drama films
1970s Spanish-language films
Films directed by Julio Porter
1970s Argentine films